Peter Martin  (born 1958) is an Australian economist, journalist and commentator.

Career
Raised in Adelaide, Martin studied Economics at Flinders University, where he earned a BEc(Hons). Martin spent a period of time employed by the Commonwealth Treasury Department. In 2019 he was appointed a visiting fellow at the Australian National University's Crawford School of Public Policy.

TV & Radio 
Martin makes regular appearances on Australian media outlets as a reporter, presenter and commentator including ABC TV show The Drum and Local ABC radio. He was the Economics Correspondent for ABC 7.30 Report, ABC Radio National programs AM and PM, and The World Today as a reporter and occasional presenter 1985–2002. From 1990 Martin was co-presenter of "Economics Report" with Phillip Lasker, Kristen Barry, Beverley O'Connor and Guy Houston. From 1993 to 2003 he contributed to the "Home Economics" segment of "Life Matters" program on Radio National with Geraldine Doogue and as co-presenter with Dr Gigi Foster for The Economists.

During 1996 he was Journalist in Residence in the Melbourne University Economics Department. From 2000 to 2001, he was the ABC's Tokyo correspondent.

Print 
Martin has been both an editor and contributor in print media. In 2014 he was appointed economics correspondent and then economics editor of The Age, ultimately leaving in 2018.

He then became economics editor of the Canberra Times and Sydney Morning Herald. While still working for Fairfax Media (now Nine Entertainment Co) he became Business and Economy editor and columnist for The Conversation.

Achievements
Distinguished Alumni of Flinders University for his contribution to popular understanding of economics (2016).
Member of the Order of Australia (2019).

Publications
Peter Martin, Ross Gittins, Jessica Irvine, Richard Denniss and Anita Forsyth (2006) The Australian Economy: A Student's Guide to Current Economic Conditions (2006), Warringal Publications, Fitzroy, Vic.

Personal life 
Martin is married to Toni Hassan, a Walkley Award winning journalist, writer and emerging artist.

References 

Living people
Date of birth missing (living people)
Australian economists
Australian journalists
1958 births